HNoMS Fridtjof Nansen is a frigate of the Royal Norwegian Navy.  Launched on 5 April 2006, she is the lead ship of the Fridtjof Nansen class of warships.

Counter-piracy
On 26 February 2009, the Norwegian government decided to deploy HNoMS Fridtjof Nansen to the Gulf of Aden, thereby participating in the ongoing Operation Atalanta, the European Union's counter-piracy campaign in Somalia. Fridtjof Nansen joined the campaign in August 2009.

Fridtjof Nansens engagement in Operation Atalanta was carried out without a permanently stationed helicopter. Mainly due to delays in delivery of the new NH-90, the ship is equipped with two ultra-fast RHIBs as a replacement.
In November 2009 she became involved in a fire-fight with suspected pirates after being attacked while inspecting a fishing vessel.

RIMPAC 2014
In 2014, Fridtjof Nansen took part in the naval exercise RIMPAC 2014 in the Pacific Ocean.

Carrier Strike Group 8
From September 2021 to May 2022, Fridtjof Nansen was fully integrated with the US Navy's Carrier Strike Group 8 (CSG-8) as part of the USN's Cooperative Deployment Program. The Nansen arrived at Naval Station Norfolk, Virginia in September 2021  and underwent extensive training, testing and certification before deploying with the USS Harry S. Truman (CVN-75) and the rest of the strike group in December 2021. The strike group was originally planned to transit the Suez Canal in early February for a cruise through the Middle East and Persian Gulf regions, but in light of the tensions surrounding the ongoing standoff between Russia and Ukraine, they were ordered to remain in the Mediterranean until further notice. The Nansen served a full 6 month deployment with the group before returning to Norway in May 2022.

References

Frigates of Norway
Fridtjof Nansen-class frigates
2004 ships
Ships built in Spain